Besla reamensis is a species of sea snail, a marine gastropod mollusk in the family Pyramidellidae, the pyrams and their allies. The species is one of twelve known within the genus Besla.

References

Pyramidellidae
Gastropods described in 1961